Ingeborg Pertmayr (7 April 1947 – 21 June 2010) was an Austrian diver. She competed at the 1964 Summer Olympics, the 1968 Summer Olympics and the 1972 Summer Olympics.

References

1947 births
2010 deaths
Austrian female divers
Olympic divers of Austria
Divers at the 1964 Summer Olympics
Divers at the 1968 Summer Olympics
Divers at the 1972 Summer Olympics
Divers from Vienna